Wendell Ray Burton (July 21, 1947 – May 30, 2017) was an American television executive and actor. He is best known for his co-starring role with Liza Minnelli in the 1969 movie The Sterile Cuckoo (1969).

Biography
Burton was born in San Antonio, Texas, the son of an Air Force sergeant who died when he was five. He became involved in college theatricals while a student at Sonoma State College (later known as Sonoma State University).

His acting career began when he won the title role in the San Francisco stage production of You're a Good Man, Charlie Brown. During the run of that successful musical, he continued his education and transferred to San Francisco State University, where he took classes in acting and directing. While performing in You're a Good Man, Charlie Brown, Burton was seen by director Alan J. Pakula and was chosen over hundreds of more experienced movie actors to star opposite Liza Minnelli in the role as Jerry Payne, the young college student with whom she falls in love in The Sterile Cuckoo (1969). In 1970, he went on the road with the national touring company of Leonard Gershe's Broadway hit Butterflies Are Free, co-starring opposite Eve Arden as her son.

Burton accepted the role as Smitty in the Metro-Goldwyn-Mayer drama film Fortune and Men's Eyes (1971), portraying an inmate who was raped shortly after entering prison, then turned into a sexual predator himself. Turning to television, he played the role of Fred Kramer, an innocent man framed for murder, in the well-received TV movie Murder Once Removed (1971) starring John Forsythe, Richard Kiley, and Barbara Bain.

In 1973, he reprised his role as Charlie Brown in the Hallmark Hall of Fame TV adaptation of the musical. That same year, he appeared in the role as Joel Clements in the anti-drug TV movie Go Ask Alice co-starring William Shatner and Ruth Roman. He played the role as Pvt. Wilson in a TV adaptation of The Red Badge of Courage (1974) with Richard Thomas.

Among his many guest starring roles on series TV in the 1970s, Burton appeared on Medical Center, Longstreet, Room 222, Love, American Style, The Rookies, and Kung Fu. He also played Dick Van Dyke and Hope Lange's son for one episode of The New Dick Van Dyke Show.

His career began to wane in the 1980s because of the quality of roles offered and his desire to turn down the roles he deemed morally unsuitable. In 1986, Burton played the role of Osgood, a mild-mannered man who fights Burt Reynolds in the big screen action/crime/drama Heat. He taught acting for a time in Hollywood. Burton began working in ad sales for TV in 1988, and eventually became the West Coast Director of Sales for the Family Channel.

Personal life
In 1977, Burton embraced evangelical Christianity and associated with the Vineyard Christian Fellowship under Pastor Kenn Gulliksen in Los Angeles.

On September 23, 1978, he and Patricia Nann were married in Los Angeles. They had two children, Haven Burton (born February 22, 1980), an actress, and Adam Burton (born May 30, 1983), a musician. In 1995 after his wife and he divorced, his career took a turn. He worked in the internet sales until in 1997 he moved to Houston, where he helped launch a local independent TV station. During this time he also became the Director of Creative Ministries at Lakewood Church. Where he met Linda Dena. On November 13, 2004, he and Linda Dena were married in Houston.

Wendell Burton lived in Houston, where he served as a Senior Director of the Champions Network, an association of pastors linked with Joel Osteen and the Lakewood Church, which gives recommendations of local Champions Network churches to broadcast viewers, and as Drama Director at Lakewood Church. He died at his home in Houston on May 30, 2017, from brain cancer. He was 69 years old.

Partial filmography 

 The Sterile Cuckoo (1969)  Jerry Payne
 Fortune and Men's Eyes (1971)  Smitty
 Go Ask Alice (1973)  Joel
 Goodnight Jackie (1974)  Robbie
 Heat (1986)  Osgood

References

External links

1947 births
2017 deaths
American television executives
American male film actors
American male stage actors
American male television actors
Male actors from Houston
Male actors from San Antonio
American Christians
Sonoma State University alumni
San Francisco State University alumni
Deaths from brain cancer in the United States